Scrobipalpa anatolica is a moth in the family Gelechiidae. It was described by Povolný in 1973. It is found in Turkey.

The ground colour of the forewings is uniform cream grey-whitish. The hindwings are grey, lightly shining.

References

Scrobipalpa
Moths described in 1973